Native Speaker (1995) is the first novel by Korean-American author Chang-Rae Lee. It explores the life of a man named Henry Park who tries to assimilate into American society.

Synopsis

Plot
Henry Park, a young Korean-American "spook" for Dennis Hoagland, is assigned to infiltrate the camp of John Kwang, a Korean-American politician running for mayor of New York City. Henry struggles with the recent separation from his white wife, Lelia, due to the premature death of their son Mitt. Further, he develops a keen double consciousness, knowing that his actions will cause the ruin of a fellow Korean-American, and tarnish an exemplar of success for members of a "model minority" in America.

Characters

Henry Park: An industrial spy who is assigned to be on John Kwang's pre-campaign team. His Korean name is Byong-ho.
Lelia Park: Henry's estranged wife who is a speech therapist from a wealthy, Scottish-American East Coast family. She met Henry at a party during one of his initial assignments.
Mitt Park : Henry and Lelia’s son who died at the age of seven.
John Kwang: A Korean-American politician running for Mayor of New York who becomes a surrogate father to Henry.
Emile Luzan: A Filipino-American therapist whom Henry spied on but ended up befriending. He helped Henry recover from Mitt's death.
Sherrie Chin-Watt: John Kwang's PR assistant. Married to a European-American banker, but having an affair with Kwang.
Mr Park: Henry's father, a strict man who was once an industrial engineer in Korea.
Mrs Park: Henry's mother who died from cancer when Henry was ten.
Dennis Hoagland: Henry's boss.
Maid (Ahjuma): A young Korean woman who took care of Henry as a child.
May: John's wife whom he met when she came from Korea.
Sophie: Jack's Italian-American wife.
Jack: Henry's best friend and coworker who is a Greek-American.
Janice Pawlowsky: Henry's manager of John Kwang.
Eduardo Fermin: A Latino man who idolizes John Kwang. He dies during a fire at Kwang's campaign headquarters. He's also a spy for Hoagland's spy firm, but John Kwang thinks he works for mayor De La Roos's reelection campaign.
Pete Ichibata: A Japanese co-worker known for crude jokes and excessive drinking.
John Kwang Jr: John's and May's son and Peter's brother troubled with school who reminded Henry of his son Mitt
Peter Kwang: John Jr's brother and son of John and May
Lelia's parents: Henry's in laws and Mitt's grandparents
Molly: Lelia's friend and an artist. During Henry and Lelia's separation, Lelia stays in Molly's apartment.

Major themes
Henry is the quintessential Korean-American, as much of his Korean heritage resonates through his voice, personality, and beliefs. His Korean upbringing still shows up in his adult life. Like many American immigrants trying to find an identity in a foreign land, Henry is an "...emotional alien...stranger [and] follower..." who constantly feels isolated from the country in which he lives and also the country from which he came. Even though he is American, Henry Park feels a constant alienation and sense of isolation. There are many challenges that come with fitting into American life because of the difference in culture, beliefs, behavior; and because of the desire to still hold on to one's heritage.

Awards and nominations 
PEN/Hemingway Award for Best First Novel
Barnes & Noble Discover Great New Writers Award
American Book Award
QPB New Visions Award
Oregon Book Award
ALA Notable Book

References 

1995 American novels
Novels by Chang-Rae Lee
Novels set in New York City
Berkley Books books
American Book Award-winning works
Hemingway Foundation/PEN Award-winning works